Enemy Creek is a stream in the U.S. state of South Dakota.

Enemy Creek received its name from a nearby skirmish between two Indian tribes.

See also
List of rivers of South Dakota

References

Rivers of Aurora County, South Dakota
Rivers of Davison County, South Dakota
Rivers of Hanson County, South Dakota
Rivers of South Dakota